Bell Rock may refer to:

 Bell Rock (Arizona), a butte near Sedona, United States
 Inchcape or the Bell Rock, a reef off the east coast of Angus, Scotland with a lighthouse